Action: The Sweet Anthology is a double compilation album of British 1970s rock band Sweet's music, released on 28 April 2009 by Shout! Factory. It features songs originally released on RCA Records and Polydor Records, including all their single records spanning from their 1971 UK breakthrough "Funny Funny" and up to their last non-charting "Sixties Man" before the original band broke up in 1982. The album also contains a few album tracks, as well as some B-sides that were never before released on compact disc in the United States.

Track listing

Personnel 
Sweet
 Andy Scott – guitar, synthesizer, backing vocals
 Steve Priest – lead vocals on "No You Don't", "California Nights", "Call Me", "Big Apple Waltz", "Give the Lady Some Respect" and "Sixties Man", bass, backing vocals
 Brian Connolly – lead vocals on all other tracks, backing vocals
 Mick Tucker – drums, percussion, backing vocals

References

The Sweet albums
2009 compilation albums
Glam rock compilation albums
Shout! Factory compilation albums